Art of Love is a studio album by Thai-American actor turned singer Art Supawatt Purdy, released on October 28, 2003, by Warner Music Thailand. The 11-track collection of love songs was produced by Tanongsak Arpornsiri, the same producer behind many successful records by Thai pop biggest names like Thongchai McIntyre and Tata Young.

After having established himself as an actor in the leading role in several Thai language television miniseries (lakhon), Purdy signed on to headline 'Lakorn in Concert', a musical on tour in a rock concert style, and discovered his love for singing and entertaining live audience. In 2003, he signed a recording contract with Warner Music Thailand and gave up acting completely to devote all of his time and energy to making this album. Tanongsak Arpornsiri, a member of Thailand legendary band GrandEx, was chosen to produce Purdy's debut effort which was recorded in six months from March to August 2003  and featured songs with pop, rock, country rock and latin influence, except the lead single 'Ya Ton Eak Leoy' which was written and produced by Sakarat Amatayakul. The result was an adult contemporary album 'Art of Love', a collection of songs about different types of love in different level of emotions. In the years that followed the release of this album, Purdy travelled the world to perform in several series of concert tours regularly in places like Japan, Europe, and USA.

Art of Love proved to be most notable in 2008 at one of the world's most prestigious film festival in Cannes when Purdy appeared as himself performing the lead single Ya Ton Eak Leoy and the uptempo version of Yaak Euie Wa Ruk live in the climactic scenes of the film presented there at 61st Cannes Film Festival called Soi Cowboy. Directed by English director Thomas Clay, Soi Cowboy was one of only 20 films that year to receive the honour of becoming the Official Selection to compete for the Un Certain Regard Award. For his effort on the soundtrack, Purdy also received the same honour in the music department for the 2 songs from Art of Love and newly recorded theme song Where We Never Grow Old.

Track listing
 "Ya Ton Eak Leoy (Groovy Mix)" (Tumrongvit Choovong, Sakarat Amatayakul) – 3:43
 "Bai Mai" (Suriya Ojareon, MONESUREE) – 4:38
 "Yark Eui Wa Rak" (Suriya Ojareon, Tanongsak Arpornsiri) – 4:37
 "Jai Mun Klua" (Suriya Ojareon, MONESUREE) – 3:39
 "Hom" (Suriya Ojareon, Tanongsak Arpornsiri) – 3:53
 "Ter Khon Pised" (Suriya Ojareon, Tanongsak Arpornsiri) – 4:34
 "Kratai Mai Jun" (Suriya Ojareon, Tanongsak Arpornsiri) – 4:04
 "Peuan Kao" (Suriya Ojareon, Tanongsak Arpornsiri) – 4:40
 "Songsai Fan Young Mai Kerd" (Suriya Ojareon, Tanongsak Arpornsiri) – 3:25
 "Du be Duu" (Suriya Ojareon, Chatchai Rungsawang) – 3:43
 "Ya Ton Eak Leoy (Original Version)" (Tumrongvit Choovong, Sakarat Amatayakul) – 3:43
 Executive Producer: Tanongsak Arpornsiri
 Producer: Tanongsak Arpornsiri

 Except (1) Uthaiwut Meuanthong (11) Sakarat Amartayakul

References

External links 
 
 
 
 
 
 Art Supawatt Official Website
 Art Supawatt Fan Website
 Art Supawatt Official Youtube Channel
 Art of Love Homepage

2003 albums
Warner Music Group albums
Thai-language albums